A general election was held in the U.S. state of Wyoming on Tuesday, November 5, 2002. All of the state's executive officers—the Governor, Secretary of State, Auditor, Treasurer, and Superintendent of Public Instruction—were up for election.

Gubernatorial election

Republican Governor Jim Geringer was unable to seek re-election due to term limits. Following a competitive primary, former State House Speaker Eli Bebout emerged as the Republican nominee. He faced Democrat Dave Freudenthal, the former U.S. Attorney. Despite the state's strong Republican lean, Freudenthal was able to narrowly defeat Bebout, winning 50% of the vote to his 48%.

Secretary of State
Republican Joe Meyer, the incumbent Secretary of State, ran for re-election to a second term. He won the Republican primary unopposed and was originally challenged by retired attorney Jim Fagan, the Democratic nominee. However, shortly after winning the Democratic nomination, Fagan dropped out of the race, citing his lack of endurance for the contest. After Fagan's withdrawal, Meyer's only opponent was Libertarian Dennis Brossman, whom he was able to handily defeat with 82% of the vote.

Democratic primary

Candidates
 Jim Fagan, retired attorney

Results

Republican primary

Candidates
 Joe Meyer, incumbent Secretary of State

Results

General election

Results

Auditor
Incumbent State Auditor Max Maxfield, a Republican, ran for re-election to a second term. He faced State Senator Mark O. Harris, the Democratic nominee, in the general election. Harris launched a vigorous campaign against Maxfield, attacking the incumbent for a data breach in the Auditor's office  and for delivering a no-bid contract to a Virginia-based security company. In a boost to his chances with the conservative electorate, Harris was endorsed by the National Rifle Association, which gave him an A+ rating and had previously awarded him the Defender of Freedom Award. Maxfield ultimately ended up winning re-election over Harris in a landslide, winning 67% of the vote to Harris's 33%.

Democratic primary

Candidates
 Mark O. Harris, State Senator from Sweetwater County

Results

Republican primary

Candidates
 Max Maxfield, incumbent State Auditor

Results

General election

Results

Treasurer
Incumbent Republican State Treasurer Cynthia Lummis ran for re-election to a second term. No candidate filed to oppose her, and she won re-election entirely unopposed.

Republican primary

Candidates
 Cynthia Lummis, incumbent State Treasurer

Results

General election

Results

Superintendent of Public Instruction
Incumbent Superintendent of Public Instruction Judy Catchpole, a Republican, was unable to seek re-election due to term limits. Competitive primaries developed on both sides. In the Republican primary, Trent Blankenship, the Superintendent of the Carbon County School District 1, and Jim Twiford, the former President of the State Senate emerged as early frontrunners. High school teacher Neil Waring and retired university professor John Mingle were also candidates. The Wyoming Education Association endorsed Waring in the Republican primary. The WEA criticized Twiford's legislative record, specifically pointing to millions of dollars in cuts to the education budget under his leadership. 

From there, the Republican primary heated up, with Blankenship and Twiford attacking each other's records. Blankenship accused Twiford of misrepresenting his credentials and for his record in the legislature. Twiford, meanwhile, argued that Blankenship's school district "is flat broke under his leadership," with the district hemorrhaging administrators. In the end, Blankenship narrowly edged out Twiford, receiving 37% of the vote while Twiford won 33%, Waring won 20%, and Mingle won 10%.

In the Democratic primary, Kathy Emmons, the Director of the Wyoming Children's Action Alliance, emerged as the early frontrunner, earning the endorsement of the WEA. The candidates largely agreed on the issues, with all of the Democrats opposing charter schools, and with Emmons and Shoults favoring increased audits of mining companies. Hoffman ended up decisively winning the primary, winning 52% of the vote to Wiederspahn's 31% and Shoults's 17%.

In the general election, Blankenship argued that Emmons had no roots in Wyoming and had no experience in the state's public school system. Emmons disputed Blankenship's characterization, pointing out that she had worked for the Wyoming Department of Health and had run pre-school programs for developmentally disabled students throughout the state. The ideological contrasts between the candidates were not significant, however, with both Blankenship and Emmons agreeing on the need to raise teacher pay and to maintain the usage of individualized education plans, though they disagreed on the philosophy of leasing school trust lands.

Blankenship ended up narrowly beating Emmons, winning 53% of the vote to her 47%. Despite losing, she was the second-strongest performing Democrat in the 2002 elections behind Freudenthal, and managed to win in ancestrally Democratic and higher-populated areas throughout the state.

Democratic primary

Candidates
 Kathy Emmons, Director of the Wyoming Children's Action Alliance
 Richard Wiederspahn, Dildine Elementary School principal
 Christopher Shoults, high school language arts teacher

Results

Republican primary

Candidates
 Trent Blankenship, Superintendent of the Carbon County School District 1
 Jim Twilford, former State Senate President
 Neil Waring, Glenrock High School teacher
 John Mingle, retired university professor

Results

General election

Results

References

 
Wyoming